The SCR-299 was a U.S. Signal Corps mobile military communications unit used during World War II.

History

The SCR-299 "mobile communications unit" was developed to provide long-range communications during World War II. The US Military sought improvements of range, flexibility and durability over its existing SCR-197 and SCR-597 transmitters. In 1942, Hallicrafters Standard HT-4 was selected as the SCR-299's transmitter, known subsequently by its military designation as the BC-610. The SCR-299 was first used on November 8, 1942 during Operation TORCH involving companies of the 829th Signal Service Battalion establishing a radio net that could exchange messages between beach-landed forces and bases in Gibraltar. Despite initial problems unloading the sets from convoy ships, the SCR-299s served until the installation of permanent Army Command and Administrative Network stations. According to US Army military historians, "General Dwight Eisenhower credited the SCR-299 in his successful reorganization of the American forces and final defeat of the Nazis at Kasserine Pass."

The SCR-299 provided reliable communications with England during the North African campaign, and in Normandy on D-Day, served as a connection between two airborne divisions with Britain. The SCR-299 was also used in the invasion of Sicily and the Allied invasion of Italy.

War correspondents and press reporters frequently made use of the SCR-299 and SCR-399. Access to the sets was provided to them by US Second Army and US Third Army Group Communications Teams, and in one instance, the SCR-399 became the only means of getting press copy direct to London.

In 1944, a short subject film was produced by the Jam Handy Organization and sponsored by the Hallicrafters Company that showed the construction of the SCR-299 and dramatized its use during World War II.

Hallicrafters Company advertising of the period sometimes used illustrations of the shelter-mounted SCR-399 to describe the achievements of the SCR-299.

Specifications

Transmitter: BC-610 plus BC-614 (speech amplifier), BC-729 (tuning unit) and BC-211 (frequency meter)
Transmitter output power: 350 watts. 
Receivers: BC-312 and BC-342
Frequency coverage: HF from 2 to 8 MHz (and 1–18 MHz using conversion kits) 
Power supply: 2000 watts, with additional 1500 watts for heater and lights supplied by PE-95 (power unit) on K-52 "Ben-Hur" style trailer. Optional 12 volt storage battery, or 115 volt 60 cycle AC commercial power and two spare 6 volt storage batteries
SCR-299 housing: K-51 van truck
SCR-399 housing: HO-17 shelter mountable on 2-ton trucks.
SCR-499 housing: air-transportable 
Frequency Conversion Kit MC-503: coverage down to 1 MHz. 
Frequency Conversion Kit MC-516: coverage to 12 MHz 
Frequency Conversion Kit MC-517: coverage to 18 MHz. 
Antennas:  whip antenna (receiver),  whip antenna (transmitter). Optional  whip antenna while stationary or  auxiliary wire antenna for 2.0 to 4.5 MHz coverage.
Remote control: field telephones, control boxes and cable.

See also
ARC-5
BC-348
BC-654
BC-610
Collins Radio
Hallicrafters SX-28
M-209
R-390A
SCR-300
SCR-536
Signal Corps Radio
Wireless Set No. 19
List of U.S. Signal Corps Vehicles

Notes

References
 TM 11-227, 10 April 1944
 TM 11-280-B
 TM 11-487 Oct. 1944, page 406

External links
 Hallicrafters HT-4, to War and home again
 The SCR299, Army Communicator United States Army Signal Center, Fort Gordon, GA
 SCR and BC list
 US Army training film featuring K-55 trailer and SCR-299
 Directory of Communications Electronic Equipment
 BC-610 data sheet
 Voice of victory

Military radio systems of the United States
World War II American electronics
Military electronics of the United States
Military equipment introduced from 1940 to 1944